KPLX (99.5 MHz, "99.5 The Wolf") is a commercial FM radio station broadcasting a gold-based mainstream country radio format.  It is licensed to Fort Worth, Texas, and serves the Dallas-Fort Worth Metroplex.  KPLX is owned by Cumulus Media, with studios and offices in the Victory Park district in Dallas, just north of downtown.  Cumulus owns two FM country stations in the radio market, but both KPLX and KSCS maintain separate staffs and musical directions.

KPLX has an effective radiated power (ERP) of 100,000 watts.  The transmitter is off West Belt Line Road in Cedar Hill, Texas, amid the towers for other FM and TV stations.  KPLX broadcasts using HD Radio technology.  The HD-2 digital subchannel carries the talk format of sister station WBAP (820 AM).

History
The station first signed on in 1962 as KXOL-FM. It operated as a sister station to KXOL (1360 AM, now KMNY). The call sign was changed to KCWM in the late 1960s and to KPLX in 1974. It was owned by the Wendall Mayes family (who also owned KNOW in Austin and KCRS in Midland, as well as interests in others) until 1974, when it was sold to Susquehanna Broadcasting.  Susquehanna was acquired by Cumulus Media in 2005.

The station had a middle of the road music format in 1974.  It switched to a country music format on January 7, 1980. The station was known on-air as "K-Plex" and during that time, the slogan was "Flex Your 'Plex".  The station re-branded as "The Wolf" on July 24, 1998, while still maintaining its country format.

KPLX has won "Radio Station of the Year" awards from the Country Music Association and the Academy of Country Music, as well as NAB Marconi Radio Awards, Billboard and Radio & Records awards.  With its parent company's acquisition of Citadel Broadcasting in 2011, KPLX became a sister station to long-time rival KSCS.  The latter shifted to a "New Country" format in 2012 to differentiate the two.

On March 15, 2022, KPLX shifted its format towards classic country. However, the station will still play country currents/recurrents overnight as part of the syndicated “Later … With Lia" show. There have been no other changes to KPLX's branding and on-air schedule.

HD Radio
KPLX broadcasts using HD Radio, and simulcasts sister station WBAP on the station's HD2 channel. Previously, the HD2 channel carried a Top 40 format as "Vibe 99-5."

Airstaff
The current weekday lineup: Brian Moote and Tara host "Wake Up with The Wolf", Smokey Rivers is heard in middays, Bill Bowen in the evening and "Later with Lia" is heard overnight.

References

External links
99.5 The Wolf official website

 DFW Radio Archives
 DFW Radio/TV History

PLX
Country radio stations in the United States
Radio stations established in 1962
1962 establishments in Texas
Cumulus Media radio stations